is a Japanese manga artist. His major works include Angel Cop, which was made into an anime series, and Tatoeba Konna Love Song.   In 2006, his manga Cupid No Itazura Nijidama was made into a TV drama. He also did some work to support an Ultraman dojinshi as well as work for Nana to Kaoru: Black Label. 
Masahito Soda, Motohiro Katou, Honna Wakou (creator of Nozoki Ana) and Taro Nogizaka (illustrator of Team Medical Dragon) are all his former assistants.

Works 
 
 
 
 
 
 
 
 
 
 
 
 
 
 

Contributions to:
 Ultraman Begins 2011 Aratana Tatakai no Hajimari dojinshi – illustrations
 Nana to Kaoru: Black Label 4-panel – Bonus art

References

External links
 Taku Kitazaki's blog (2007-) 
 Taku Kitazaki's earlier blog 
 Young Sunday's profile of Taku Kitazaki 
 Taku Kitazaki manga at Media Arts Database 

1966 births
Living people
Manga artists from Hyōgo Prefecture